Paul John Quantrill (born November 3, 1968) is a Canadian former professional baseball right-handed relief pitcher. He played in Major League Baseball (MLB) for 14 seasons, from 1992 to 2005; his longest tenure was six seasons with the Toronto Blue Jays. Quantrill appeared in 80 or more games five times, led his league in pitching appearances for four consecutive seasons, and did not walk more than 25 batters in a season from 1996 onwards.

Career
Quantrill was drafted in 1986 MLB draft by the Los Angeles Dodgers in the 26th round, 660th overall, but did not sign. After three years at the University of Wisconsin he was drafted again, by the Boston Red Sox in the sixth round of the 1989 MLB draft, 161st overall, and made his major league debut on July 20, 1992.

Originally considered a starter, Quantrill eventually found consistency as a reliever after several years of splitting time between the bullpen and the starting rotation for several teams. Some of his best years came for the Toronto Blue Jays, a team located in his home province of Ontario. Quantrill earned a reputation for being very durable and having impeccable control; commentators often joked that he had a "rubber arm".

Before the 2004 season, Quantrill signed a two-year, $6.8-million deal with the New York Yankees. Quantrill pitched effectively for the Yankees as a set-up man for most of the season, leading Yankees announcer Michael Kay to create the nickname “Quan-Gor-Mo” for the “three-headed monster” that made up the Yankees usual bullpen progression of Quantrill, Tom Gordon and Mariano Rivera (known as “Mo”). 

Due to poor performance, arguably due to overuse by manager Joe Torre, in late 2004 and early 2005, Quantrill was designated for assignment on July 1, 2005. The next day he was traded to the San Diego Padres for pitchers Tim Redding and Darrell May. Quantrill was then traded to the Florida Marlins and spent the rest of the year in the bullpen. While playing in the 2006 World Baseball Classic, Quantrill announced that he would retire at the end of the event.

Quantrill served as a coach for Team Canada during the World Baseball Classics in 2009, 2013, and 2017.

On June 19, 2010, Quantrill was inducted, along with former Blue Jay Roberto Alomar, into the Canadian Baseball Hall of Fame in St. Marys, Ontario.

Accomplishments
 All-Star (2001)
 4× led his league in appearances (2001 AL, 2002 NL, 2003 NL, 2004 AL)
 Career 3.83 earned run average (ERA)
 Holds New York Yankees record for most games pitched in a season (86 in 2004)

Personal life
Since retirement, Quantrill has lived in Port Hope, Ontario.

Quantrill has a son and two daughters. His son, Cal, was a pitcher at Stanford University and was selected in the first round, eighth overall, in the 2016 MLB draft by the San Diego Padres and currently plays for the Cleveland Guardians.

, Quantrill serves as a special assistant to the Toronto Blue Jays organization.

See also
List of Major League Baseball players from Canada

References

External links

1968 births
2006 World Baseball Classic players
Living people
American League All-Stars
Baseball people from Ontario
Boston Red Sox players
Canadian baseball coaches
Canadian Baseball Hall of Fame inductees
Canadian expatriate baseball players in the United States
Elmira Pioneers players
Florida Marlins players
Gulf Coast Red Sox players
Los Angeles Dodgers players
Major League Baseball pitchers
Major League Baseball players from Canada
New Britain Red Sox players
New York Yankees players
Pawtucket Red Sox players
People from Essex County, Ontario
People from Northumberland County, Ontario
Philadelphia Phillies players
San Diego Padres players
Scranton/Wilkes-Barre Red Barons players
Sportspeople from London, Ontario
Syracuse SkyChiefs players
Toronto Blue Jays players
Winter Haven Red Sox players
Wisconsin Badgers baseball players
World Baseball Classic players of Canada